Kay Friedmann (born 15 May 1963 in Speyer) is a retired German football player. From 1995 to 2008 he worked as a physiotherapist for 1. FC Kaiserslautern.

Honours
 Bundesliga champion: 1990–91
 DFB-Pokal winner: 1989–90

References

External links
 

1963 births
Living people
German footballers
1. FC Kaiserslautern players
FC 08 Homburg players
1. FC Nürnberg players
Bundesliga players
2. Bundesliga players
Association football defenders
People from Speyer
Footballers from Rhineland-Palatinate
West German footballers